Newcastle Township may refer to one of the following places in the United States:

 Newcastle Township, Fulton County, Indiana
 Newcastle Township, Dixon County, Nebraska
 Newcastle Township, Coshocton County, Ohio

See also
 New Castle Township, Schuylkill County, Pennsylvania
 Newcastle (disambiguation)

Township name disambiguation pages